Carl Vesty (born 25 May 1953) is  a former Australian rules footballer who played with Footscray in the Victorian Football League (VFL)	and Woodville in the South Australian National Football League (SANFL).

Notes

External links 
		

Living people
1953 births
Australian rules footballers from Victoria (Australia)
Western Bulldogs players
Morwell Football Club players
Woodville Football Club players